School Shock, also known as Chu Feng B.E.E, often stylized 雛蜂-B.E.E-, is a Chinese manhua and animated series. Originally a sci-fi webcomic, School Shock was adapted into an animation when it gained popularity on the U17 comic website. The first series has 12 episodes. The main characters are Liuli, Baihua, Sun Hao Xuan, Zhou Zhong Rong, etc.

The series began airing in China on July 23, 2015, and in Japan on August 15, 2015. It is the first Chinese-made animated series to be broadcast simultaneously in China (in Mandarin) and Japan (in Japanese). Japanese critics described the series as Japanese anime produced in China and lacking Chinese creative elements.

School Shock comic books have also been published in Simplified Chinese by a Jilin publisher, and in Traditional Chinese by a Hong Kong publisher. A second season of School Shock was also announced in 2020 and the 6 episodes production was later finished that year.

References

Manhua titles
Fiction about the People's Liberation Army
Chinese animated television series
Chinese webcomics
2015 Chinese television series debuts
Television shows based on manhua
Science fiction webcomics
Television shows based on webcomics
Haoliners Animation League
Webcomics in print
Animated series based on comics
Manhua adapted into television series
Mecha anime and manga
Cyborgs in fiction
Terrorism in fiction